Águas da Prata is a Brazilian municipality in the state of São Paulo. The population is 8,221 (2020 est.) in an area of 143 km².

References

Municipalities in São Paulo (state)